The Tawussite Shia (attributed to ʿAjlan ibn Tawus) were a Shia group who were a section of the supporters of Imam Ja'far al-Sadiq who denied admitting that he died. They believed that he was the Awaited Mahdi and that he was alive and did not die. 
 
After the death of Imam Muhammad al-Baqir, the defeat of Muhammad ibn Abdallah An-Nafs Az-Zakiyya, the triumph of the Abbasids, and the popularity of Imam Ja'far al-Sadiq, reports became widespread on his Mahdism. Al-Nubakhti reports that: “Some Shiites (i.e. Tawussites) have reported (falsely) from Imam Sadiq that he said: ‘If you see my head rolling to you from the mountain, you should not believe that, for I am your Sahib (Mahdi)’” and: “If anyone informs you that he nursed me, washed my body (after death) and shrouded me, do not believe him, I am your companion (Sahib) and the companion of the sword.”

Among the Tawussites was Aban ibn Uthman al-Ahmar, who was considered by Shia scholar al-Kashi to have been one of the men of Ijma (consensus), i.e. one of the supposed closest people to Imam Sadiq.

See also
Islamic schools and branches
List of extinct Shia sects

References

Shia Islamic branches
Schisms in Islam
8th-century Islam